Gordon Beves (15 March 1862 – 22 March 1927) was a South African cricket umpire. He stood in one Test match in 1896. He also played in eighteen first-class matches from 1888 to 1898/99. Beeves was the captain of Transvaal when they won the Currie Cup in 1895, and later became the Chairman of the South African Cricket Association.

See also
 List of Test cricket umpires

References

1862 births
1927 deaths
Sportspeople from Brighton
Nottinghamshire cricketers
South African Test cricket umpires
Gauteng cricketers